Behind the Sun may refer to:

 Behind the Sun (film), a 2001 film directed by Walter Salles
 Behind the Sun (Chicane album), 2000
 Behind the Sun (Eric Clapton album), and the title song, 1985
 Behind the Sun (Dive album), and the title song, 2004
 Behind the Sun (Motorpsycho album), 2014
 "Behind the Sun" (Red Hot Chili Peppers song), 1987
 "Behind the Sun" (Alexander Klaws song), 2004
 "Behind the Sun", a song by Living Colour from the 2009 album The Chair in the Doorway
 "Behind the Sun", a song by The Good, the Bad & the Queen from the 2007 album The Good, the Bad & the Queen
 "Behind the Sun", a song by Meshuggah from the 2012 album Koloss

See also
 Sun (disambiguation)
 Men Behind the Sun, a 1987 Chinese film
 Things Behind the Sun, a 2001 film directed by Allison Anders
 "Things Behind the Sun", a song by Nick Drake from the 1972 album Pink Moon